Metopium brownei (also known as chechem, chechen, or black poisonwood) is a species of plant in the family Anacardiaceae.

Distribution and habitat
It is found in Hispaniola (the Dominican Republic and Haiti), Cuba, Jamaica, northern Guatemala, Belize, and from the Yucatán to Veracruz in Mexico.

Description
Like its cousin, Metopium toxiferum, it produces urushiol in its bark, which can cause contact dermatitis; therefore, live trees and fresh cut logs should be handled carefully. The wood of this tree is a valuable source of lumber in Central America and the West Indies.

References

Anacardiaceae
Flora of Guatemala